Edward Dodge House may refer to:

Edward Dodge House (Cambridge, Massachusetts), listed on the National Register of Historic Places in Middlesex County, Massachusetts
Edward Dodge House (Port Washington, Wisconsin), listed on the National Register of Historic Places in Ozaukee County, Wisconsin

See also
Dodge House (disambiguation)